Gbarzon District is one of three districts located in Grand Gedeh County, Liberia.

Chiefdoms of Gbarzon district: Biai and Gbason

Clans of Biai chiefdom: Biai and Krason

Clans of Gbason chiefdom: Gbagbor and Nisoni

Districts of Liberia
Grand Gedeh County